The Schlossbach is a river of Tyrol, Austria, a left tributary of the Inn.

The Schlossbach rises below the Reither Spitze in the municipality of Reith bei Seefeld and flows in a north to south direction. After around  it collects the river Grieskarbach from the left. In its upper reaches is a gorge, the Schlossbachklamm.

After emerging from the narrow gorge into the Inn valley, the Schlossbach flows through Zirl and empties into the Inn southwest of the village. Together with the Ehnbach further east, it has pushed the Inn southwards and piled up the alluvial fan on which Zirl has been built.

References 

Rivers of Tyrol (state)
Rivers of Austria